Toxosiphon is a genus of flowering plants belonging to the family Rutaceae.

Its native range is South America and North America.

Species:
 Toxosiphon carinatus (Little) Kallunki 
 Toxosiphon lindenii (Baill.) Baill.

References

Zanthoxyloideae
Zanthoxyloideae genera